Electric brake is an ambiguous term meaning more than one thing:
 Dynamic braking, Braking using magnetic currents either to charge a battery or waste as heat
 Electric friction brake, Electrically controlled friction brake
 Track brake
 Regenerative brake